William Barlow (October 26, 1822 – June 18, 1904) was an early Oregon pioneer and founder of Barlow, Oregon, United States.

Barlow arrived in Oregon as a young man in 1845.  He purchased land and founded the town of Canemah, now part of Oregon City, Oregon.
When William and his brother James were tending the toll gate on the Barlow Road in 1847, they met their brides-to-be, Rachel and Rebecca Larkins, the young daughters of William E. Larkins and his wife, Rachel Reed. On August 20, 1848, William married Rachel. She died a month later.

In 1852 he married widow Mrs. Martha Ann Allen; they had three children: Mary, Virginia and Cassius.

Sometime after 1848, Barlow purchased a  land claim from his father Sam Barlow for $6,000.  In 1891, he founded the town of Barlow on that land.  His residence, now known as the Barlow House, still stands near Barlow.

See also
Barlow Road

References

 "State of Oregon: Blue Book - Oregon's Cemeteries Web Exhibit". sos.oregon.gov. Retrieved 2022-08-15

Oregon pioneers
People from Oregon City, Oregon
1822 births
1904 deaths